French: from the personal name Edelot, a pet form of any of various Old French names of Germanic origin containing the element edel ‘noble’. American families bearing this name, as well as French families named Aydalot, are traceable to Gascony and Guyenne.
Source: Dictionary of American Family Names ©2013, Oxford University Press

Places

Aydelotte, Oklahoma

People with surname Aydelotte

Frank Aydelotte, American educator and director of the Institute for Advanced Study
Myrtle Aydelotte, American nurse, professor and hospital administrator
William O. Aydelotte, American historian

People with middle name Aydelotte

Davis Aydelotte Robertson (Dave Robertson), American baseball player
Henry Aydelotte Houston, American politician